In molecular biology, the amylin protein family or calcitonin/CGRP/IAPP protein family is a family of proteins, which includes the precursors of calcitonin/calcitonin gene-related peptide (CGRP), islet amyloid polypeptide (IAPP) and adrenomedullin.

Calcitonin is a 32 amino acid polypeptide hormone that causes a rapid but short-lived drop in the level of calcium and phosphate in the blood, by promoting the incorporation of these ions in the bones, alpha type. Alternative splicing of the gene coding for calcitonin produces a distantly related peptide of 37 amino acids, called calcitonin gene-related peptide (CGRP), beta type. CGRP induces vasodilatation in a variety of vessels, including the coronary, cerebral and systemic vasculature. Its abundance in the CNS also points toward a neurotransmitter or neuromodulator role.

Islet amyloid polypeptide (IAPP) (also known as diabetes-associated peptide (DAP), or amylin) is a peptide of 37 amino acids that selectively inhibits insulin-stimulated glucose utilization and glycogen deposition in muscle, while not affecting adipocyte glucose metabolism. Structurally, IAPP is closely related to CGRP.

Two conserved cysteines in the N-terminal of these peptides are known to be involved in a disulfide bond. The C-terminal amino acid of all three peptides is amidated.

                xCxxxxxCxxxxxxxxxxxxxxxxxxxxxxxxxxxx-NH(2)
                 |     |                             Amide group
                 +-----+

Subfamilies
Calcitonin, alpha type 
Calcitonin, beta type

Human proteins containing this domain 
CALCA;     CALCB;     IAPP

References

Protein families
Peptide hormones